Oakland Community College (OCC) is a public community college with five campuses in Oakland County, Michigan.  Established in 1964, OCC is the largest community college in Michigan, with the state's third-largest undergraduate enrollment. Enrollment at the college for the 2016-2017 school year was 29,560. Oakland Community College has been accredited by the Higher Learning Commission since 1971, and has a Carnegie Classification of Associate's Colleges: High Transfer-High Nontraditional. The college offers 57 Associate degrees and 41 different programs.

Several students and faculty in OCC's culinary arts program have been awarded state, national, and international culinary awards.

History
The college opened in September 1965 with two campuses - Highland Lakes and Auburn Hills. A third campus opened in Farmington Hills in 1967. In 1980, a new campus opened in Southfield that replaced a temporary location in Oak Park. Later, the Southeast Campus System expanded through the purchase and remodeling of buildings at a site in Royal Oak. The Royal Oak buildings were replaced by a new campus complex which opened in the fall of 1982.

Future Plan 
In November 2022, OCC, citing declining enrollment and a changing job market, announced a three-year plan to fundamentally restructure and consolidate operations. The plan will see the complete closure of the Highland Lakes campus in the fall of 2025, as well as the closure and sale of the Bee Administration Center, with administrative offices relocating to the campuses. It will also include the relocation of health sciences programs to Orchard Ridge (from Highland Lakes and Southfield), and culinary programs from Orchard Ridge to a new culinary studies institute at Royal Oak, plus the renovation of the CREST training center and a new skilled trades and industrial technology center at Auburn Hills.

Campuses
Oakland Community College holds in-person classes at five campuses throughout Oakland County. OCC has also offered online classes since the early 2000s.

Auburn Hills 

The Auburn Hills campus is located off M-59 in Auburn Hills, across the road from Chrysler Headquarters and near I-75. Built on a former Army Nike missile site in then-Pontiac Township, Auburn Hills was one of the two original OCC campuses (along with Highland Lakes), opening for classes in the fall of 1965. OCC originally coined the name "Auburn Hills," fourteen years before Pontiac Township incorporated as the City of Auburn Hills.

The Auburn Hills campus is home to OCC's police academy, and the Combined Regional Emergency Services Training (CREST) center.

Highland Lakes 
The Highland Lakes campus is located at Cooley Lake and Hospital Roads on the south edge of Waterford Township. It opened in the fall of 1965 in the former Oakland County Sanitarium, a tuberculosis hospital constructed in 1927. Additional buildings were added to the campus in the early 1980s, and two were expanded in the mid-2000s. The original building, then known as Highland Hall, was demolished in 2013.

Highland Lakes is slated to close in the fall of 2025 as part of OCC's restructuring plan.

Orchard Ridge 
The Orchard Ridge campus is located along I-696 between Orchard Lake and Farmington Roads in Farmington Hills. It opened in the fall of 1967. The Brutalist campus was designed by architect Philip Will Jr., known for his partnership in the firm Perkins & Will.

OCC's culinary program is housed at the Orchard Ridge campus, with three restaurants open to the public on certain days. Orchard Ridge is also home to Oakland Early College, an early college high school operated by the West Bloomfield School District. A radio station, WORB, operated at Orchard Ridge until 1999.

Royal Oak 

OCC's current Royal Oak campus opened in 1982, and consists of a single large building in downtown Royal Oak, bordered by Main Street, Washington Avenue, 7th Street, and Lincoln Avenue. It is served by two parking garages across the street.

Southfield 
OCC's Southfield campus is located along the Lodge Freeway (M-10) half a mile north of the Detroit/Wayne County border, near the former Northland Center. The Southfield campus opened in 1980, replacing a site in nearby Oak Park. It consists of one large building, doubled in size by a late-2000s expansion.

George A. Bee Administration Center 
OCC's administrative offices are located at 2480 Opdyke Road in Bloomfield Hills; this is typically listed as OCC's official address, despite no classes being held there. From 2006-2007, they were temporarily located at 3903 W Hamlin Road in Rochester Hills, while the Bee Administration Center was being renovated.

As part of OCC's restructuring plan, the Bee Center was listed for sale in December 2022 and will close once a suitable buyer is found for the property.

Pontiac Center 
OCC previously had operations at 17 S Saginaw Street in downtown Pontiac. The Pontiac Center closed in 2015.

Student life
The OCC athletic teams are known as the Raiders and compete in the National Junior College Athletic Association (NJCAA) and the Michigan Community College Athletic Association (MCCAA).  Men's varsity sports include basketball, cross-country, and golf; women's varsity sports include basketball, cross-country, and softball. OCC also has a competitive speech and performance team (the forensics team) that has had both State and National champions.

Notable alumni
Andrew J. Feustel - Geophysicist and NASA astronaut
Pam Dawber - Actress, Mork & Mindy
Myles Jury - wrestler; professional mixed martial arts fighter
Tomo Miličević - lead guitarist of rock band Thirty Seconds to Mars
Ted Nugent - rock musician 
Jem Targal - bass guitarist and singer for the rock group Third Power

See also
WORB - Defunct Radio Station

References

External links
Official website

Community colleges in Michigan
Michigan Community College Athletic Association
Universities and colleges in Oakland County, Michigan
Schools in Auburn Hills, Michigan
Farmington Hills, Michigan
Royal Oak, Michigan
Southfield, Michigan
Two-year colleges in the United States
Educational institutions established in 1965
NJCAA athletics
1965 establishments in Michigan